The Chicago Cubs are a professional baseball team based in Chicago, Illinois. The Cubs are members of the National League (NL) Central Division in Major League Baseball (MLB). In baseball, the head coach of a team is called the manager, or more formally, the field manager. The duties of the team manager include team strategy and leadership on and off the field. Since their inception as the White Stockings in 1876, the Cubs have employed 61 managers.  The franchise's first manager was Baseball Hall of Famer Albert Spalding, who helped the White Stockings become the first champions of the newly formed National League.

After co-managing with Silver Flint during the 1879 Chicago White Stockings season, Hall of Famer Cap Anson began an 18-year managerial tenure in 1880, the longest in franchise history. Under Anson, the team won five more NL pennants — in 1880, 1881, 1882, 1885 and 1886—tying the 1885 World Series and losing the 1886 World Series in the process. Anson won 1,283 games as the White Stockings' manager, the most in franchise history. After taking over for Hall of Fame manager Frank Selee in 1905, Frank Chance — another Hall of Famer — managed the team through the 1912 season. During his tenure, the franchise won four more NL pennants in 1906, 1907, 1908, and 1910, winning its only two World Series titles in 1907 and 1908 until 2016 Chance's .664 career winning percentage is the highest of any Cubs manager. After Chance, from 1913 through 1960, the Cubs employed nineteen managers, nine of which were inducted into the Hall of Fame. During this period, the Cubs won six more NL pennants, including three under manager Charlie Grimm. Split between Grimm's two managerial stints in the 1930s and 1940s, plus a brief appearance as manager in 1960, Grimm accumulated 946 career wins, second-most in franchise history behind Anson.

Owner P. K. Wrigley then began experimenting with the managerial position and in December 1960, announced that Cubs would not have only one manager for the coming season. Instead, the team implemented a new managerial system known as the "College of Coaches". The system was meant to blend ideas from several individuals instead of relying on one manager. During its first year, the team rotated four managers into the role: Vedie Himsl, Harry Craft, El Tappe and Lou Klein. The next year, under the guidance of Tappe, Klein and Charlie Metro, the Cubs lost a franchise-record 103 games. Bob Kennedy managed the team for the next three seasons until Hall of Famer Leo Durocher assumed the managerial role for the 1966 season, effectively ending the five-year-long "College of Coaches" experiment. During his first season as manager, Durocher's Cubs tied the franchise's 103-game loss record set four years earlier by the "College"; however, he maintained a winning record for the rest of his seven-year tenure.

In the 42 seasons after Durocher, the Cubs employed 25 managers. Jim Frey and Don Zimmer led the team to the National League Championship Series (NLCS) in 1984 and 1989, respectively. In both of those seasons, the team's manager won a Manager of the Year Award. Jim Riggleman managed the team for five years from 1995 through 1999, earning the team's first wild card playoff spot in 1998. Dusty Baker's Cubs lost in the 2003 NLCS during the first year of a four-year managing tenure. Baker's successor, Lou Piniella, led the team to two consecutive National League Central Division titles during his first two years with the team and was awarded the 2008 Manager of the Year Award. During the 2010 season, Piniella announced his intention to retire as manager of the Cubs at the end of the year. He instead resigned after a game in August, however, citing family reasons. Third base coach Mike Quade finished the remainder of the season as manager.

When manager Joe Maddon became a free agent near the end of 2014, the Cubs fired Rick Renteria after only one season to bring Maddon on to lead the club. He was signed to a five-year, $25 million contract. From 2015 through 2019, Maddon led the team to the playoffs four times. He was awarded the 2015 Manager of the Year Award and went on to help the club break its 108-year World Series drought in 2016. Epstein and Maddon announced in a joint press conference that the Cubs would let Maddon's initial five-year contract expire. The team brought on former-Cubs catcher David Ross to replace Maddon, signing him to a three-year contract.

Table key

Managers 
Statistics current through 2021 season

See also
List of Chicago Cubs owners and executives

Notes
The 19th-century World Series was a different event from the current World Series, which was first played in 1903. The 19th-century World Series was considered an exhibition contest between the champion of the National League and the champion of the American Association.
Jim Frey won the Manager of the Year Award for the 1984 season.
Don Zimmer won the Manager of the Year Award for the 1989 season.
Lou Piniella won the Manager of the Year Award for the 2008 season.
Joe Maddon won the Manager of the Year Award for the 2015 season.

References
General

Specific

List
Managers
Chicago Cubs